Zarishat is a village in the Amasia Municipality of the Shirak Province of Armenia.

Demographics 
According to 1912 publication of Kavkazskiy kalendar, there was a mainly Karapapakh population of 260 in the village of Gonjali of the Kars Okrug in the Kars Oblast.

The population of the village since 1897 is as follows:

References 

Populated places in Shirak Province